The 1961–62 Hong Kong First Division League season was the 51st since its establishment.

League table

References
1961–62 Hong Kong First Division table (RSSSF)

Hong Kong First Division League seasons
Hong
football